Lodoïska is an opera by Luigi Cherubini to a French libretto by Claude-François Fillette-Loraux after an episode from Jean-Baptiste Louvet de Couvrai’s novel, Les amours du chevalier de Faublas. It takes the form of a comédie héroïque (a type of opéra comique) in three acts, and was a founding work of rescue opera. It has also been called one of the first Romantic operas, though Cherubini's work was basically classical.

Stephen Willis has explained the importance of the work: 
"With Lodoïska Cherubini turned his back on his training as an Italian composer of opera seria, choosing the freer form of opéra comique over the more stilted and confining tragédie lyrique and embarking on a course of development of opéra comique which was to lead to the eradication of almost all differences between the two genres, except for the spoken dialogue." 

Basil Deane has called the opera "entirely original in its depth of psychological insight, dramatic tension, and musical depth."

Performance history
It was first performed at the Théâtre Feydeau in Paris on 18 July 1791.

The opera was received enthusiastically and ran for 200 performances. It was so popular that it was revived again at the Feydeau in 1819 and was performed frequently in the Germanic countries in the early 19th century, including a production in Vienna in 1805, while Cherubini was there. John Philip Kemble produced an English version in 1794. It was first performed in New York on 4 December 1826.

Roles

Synopsis
Place: Poland
Time: 1600

Act 1 

A group of Tartar warriors, led by Titzikan, are approaching the castle of a notorious baron named 
Dourlinsky. One of Titzikan's men reports that Dourlinsky leaves the castle frequently, and that while 
he's gone the castle could be taken easily. But Titzikan says that a sneak attack would be underhanded 
— he wants to defeat Dourlinsky in a fair contest. They then hear someone approaching, and hide in the woods to observe.

The Polish count Floreski appears with his faithful attendant Varbel. Their horses have been stolen by the 
Tartars, so they're trudging along on foot. Floreski is hunting for his girlfriend, Lodoiska. The two had 
planned to be married. But Lodoiska's father had a political disagreement with Floreski. So he cancelled 
the wedding, denounced Floreski and hid Lodoiska in a secret location. Since then, her father has died and 
nobody knows exactly where she is.

Floreski and Varbel are confronted by Titzikan and one of his warriors. In a fight, the tartars are disarmed. Titzikan is impressed by Floreski's honorable way of battle, and the two men form an alliance. Titzikan says he and his forces are planning to attack Baron Dourlinski, whose forces have ravaged their land — and he says that Dourlinski lives in the nearby castle.

Floreski remembers that Dourlinski was a friend of Lodoiska's father. Can this be where she's been hidden? 
A stone then lands at his feet, with a note attached. It was thrown by Lodoiska herself. She's being held in the castle's prison tower. When Floreski approaches the tower, she sings to him, saying that at midnight, he should climb to the top of the tower and lower a note to her window.

But the skittish Varbel has another idea. Dourlinsky doesn't know that Lodoiska's father has died. Varbel 
says they should go to the castle, deliver the news, and say they've been sent by Lodoiska's mother to bring her home. Floreski agrees. They knock on the castle door and a wary servant ushers them inside.

Act 2 

Dourlinsky's henchman Altamoras has taken Lodoiska from 
the tower to a dark hall deep inside the castle, along 
with her nurse, Lysinka. Dourlinsky himself then enters 
and orders Lysinka out of the room. He wants to speak 
with Lodoiska privately.
Durlinsky has decided to marry Lodoiska. When she 
tells him he has no right to marry her, he replies that 
he has the rights of "a lover who has you in his 
power." She tells him he's a monster, not a lover, and 
that she's in love with someone else — Count Floreski. 

There's a vehement confrontation and Dourlinsky orders 
his men to take her to the darkest, most secret part of 
the prison tower. He also vows to track down this 
Floreski, whoever he is, and get rid of him.
With Lodoiska gone, Dourlinsky meets with Floreski and 
Varbel, not knowing who they are. When they tell him 
they've been sent to take Lodoiska back to her mother, 
Dourlinsky plainly doesn't believe it. He tells them to 
report back that Lodoiska is no longer with him. 
Knowing Dourlinsky is lying, Floreski hesitates, not 
sure what to do next. To buy some time, he says that he 
and Varbel would like to stay the night, to rest up 
before their journey home. Dourlinsky agrees, but tells 
Altamoras to keep an eye on them.

Alone, Floreski is fuming. He realizes that Dourlinsky 
plans to steal Lodoiska for himself. Varbel then joins 
him with disturbing news: He's overheard a couple of 
Dourlinsky's men, who are planning to offer them some 
refreshments — two glasses of poisoned wine.
When the men appear, Floreski stalls for time — and 
Varbel switches the wine they've been offered for the 
glasses Dourlinsky's men have brought for themselves. 
They all drink up, and the would-be poisoners are soon 
out cold. But when Floreski and Varbel try to escape, 
Dourlinsky confronts them with a group of soldiers. 
Floreski defiantly reveals his identity, and he and 
Varbel are taken prisoner.

Dourlinsky goes to Lodoiska with an ultimatum. If she 
refuses to marry him, Floreski will be killed. Not 
knowing what's happened back at home, Lodoiska pleads a 
technicality: She can't be married unless her father is 
there to give her away. Dourlinsky curtly tells her 
that her father is dead, and Lodoiska passes out from 
shock.

Floreski is then dragged in, and as Lodoiska regains 
consciousness, she runs to him. Dourlinsky repeats his 
demand: Either Lodoiska marries him, or Floreski dies. 
Lodoiska tells Dourlinsky that she'd rather be stabbed 
through the heart than marry him. Then she and Floreski 
vow to die together rather than give in.
Dourlinsky had been sure that he was about to get what 
he wanted, and wonders what to do next. But it's a moot 
point when cannon fire is heard. Titzikan, Floreski's 
Tartar ally, is attacking the castle with his army.

In a spectacular scene that helped to make the opera a 
hit in Paris, one of the castle walls is blown up, then 
crumbles to reveal the battlefield outside. In fierce 
fighting, the Tartars overcome Dourlinsky's forces. 
While that goes on, Dourlinsky hides Lodoiska in the 
tower, but Titzikan rescues her just as the tower 
collapses. The resourceful Tartar also manages to save 
Floreski — snatching a dagger from Dourlinsky's hands 
in the nick of time.
With his castle in flames around him, Dourlinsky admits 
defeat — while Floreski and Lodoiska celebrate their 
reunion.

Recordings
Conducted by Riccardo Muti live from the Teatro alla Scala (Sony Music CD 5099709312625) 
Łukasz Borowicz (Ludwig van Beethoven Association 2008, 5907812241858).
Jérémie Rhorer (2010 recording by Le Cercle de l'Harmonie on Naïve AM 209)

References
Notes

Sources
 
 Warrack, John and Ewan West, "Lodoïska", The Oxford Dictionary of Opera, Oxford University Press, 1992, p. 414 
 Willis, Stephen C (1992), Lodoïska, The New Grove Dictionary of Opera, ed. Stanley Sadie (London)

See also 

Operas
Operas by Luigi Cherubini
French-language operas
Opéras comiques
Rescue operas
1791 operas
Operas based on novels
Operas set in Poland